Bolara is a small village in Bankura I CD Block in Bankura district, West Bengal, India (population 850). Shideswar temple is a famous temple and its fall under ASI.

Villages in Bankura district